Kamel El Basha or Kamel el-Basha  (born March 14, 1962 in East Jerusalem), is a  Palestinian theater actor and director and film actor who won the 2017 Volpi Cup for Best Actor (masculine) during the 74th Venice International Film Festival for his role as Yasser Abdallah Salameh in The Insult (also known in ) by the Lebanese film director Ziad Doueiri. It was El Basha's first major role on screen, although he had appeared in a number of theatrical productions, actually also directing some of them, in addition to a handful of films in small roles.

Kamel El Basha is a Palestinian actor of screen and stage, theater director, play-writer and producer. He began his career as a stage actor during the 1980s. He gained critical acclaim in 2017 when he won the Volpi Cup for Best Actor (male) during the 74th Venice International Film Festival for his role as Yasser Abdallah Salameh in The Insult by the Lebanese film director Ziad Doueiri. It was El Basha's first major role on screen, although he had appeared in a number of theatrical productions, actually also directing some of them. He is the former artistic director of the Palestinian National Theater in Jerusalem from 2007 to 2011 and the artistic director of Quds Art since 2012.

Filmography
2002 : Case (حاله ) 
2009: Lesh Sabreen? 
2014: Al Helm,documentary 
2015: Love, Theft and Other Entanglements AKA Al-hob wa al-sariqa wa mashakel ukhra as Abu Mustafa 
2015: Solomon's Stone (film) as a police investigator 
2016 : Defying my disability , doc:  executive producer 
2017: The Insult as Yasser Abdallah Salameh 
2017 : السهام المارقه TV 
2018: the reports on Sarah and Saleem as: Abo epraheem 
2019 : Green Grass as Hussen  
2020: The Traslater as Prof Raed  
2020: Carfew as Yihia 
2022: Room 207 as Mina (tv)

Theatre
(Selective)

Directing
Suquut al Qastal (سقوط القسطل)
Ness Kiis Rasas (نص كيس رصاص)
Al Qamees al Masruq (القميص المسروق)
Madeenat al Sa'aada (مدينة السعادة)
Ward wa Yasmeen (ورد وياسمين)
Al Arees (العريس)
Sahra Maqdisiyyah (سهرة مقدسية)

Acting
Al Qamees al Masruq (القميص المسروق)
Al Aydi al Qazira (الأيدي القذرة)
Al Zeer Salem (الزير سالم)
Mawta bila Qubuur (موتى بلا قبور) 
Hajar al Tahqeeq (حجر التحقيق)

External links

References 

Palestinian male film actors
Jordanian male film actors
1962 births
Living people
People from Jerusalem
Volpi Cup for Best Actor winners
Prisoners and detainees of Israel
Baghdad